Mikael Bodlore-Penlaez (born 1975) is a Breton author and cartographer. He co-edited, with Divi Kervella, the first bilingual Atlas of Brittany (French / Breton) who has received several awards, including the "Brittany's Prize of the Book".

He was born in Brest.

Bibliography

Books in English
 Atlas of Stateless Nations, minority peoples in search of recognition (translated in English by Ciaran and Sarah Finn), Ed. Y Lolfa, 2011

Books in French or (bilingual Breton/French)
 Guide des drapeaux bretons et celtes (Guide for Breton and Celtic flags) (with Divi Kervella), Ed. Yoran Embanner, 2008 
 Atlas des Nations sans État, peuples minoritaires en quête de reconnaissance, Ed. Yoran Embanner, 2010 
 Atlas de Bretagne / Atlas Breizh (Atlas of Brittany) (with Divi Kervella), Ed. Coop Breizh, 2011 
 Musique classique bretonne / Sonerezh klasel Breizh (Breton classical music), Cras, Ladmirault, Le Flem, Le Penven, Ropartz... (with Aldo Ripoche), Ed. Coop Breizh, 2012 
 Bretagne, les questions qui dérangent (Brittany, tough questions) (with Pierre-Emmanuel Marais & Lionel Henry), Ed. Yoran Embanner, 2014 
 La France charcutée, petite histoire du "big bang" territorial" (Butchered France, brief history of the regional reform), Ed. Coop Breizh, 2014 
 Atlas des mondes celtiques / Atlas ar bed keltiek (Atlas of Celtic world) (with Erwan Chartier-Le Floch & Divi Kervella), Ed. Coop Breizh, 2014 
 Réunifier la Bretagne, région contre métropoles ? (with les Géographes de Bretagne, under the direction of Yves Lebahy and Gael Briand), Ed. Skol Vreizh, 2015 
 Gwenn-ha-Du, le drapeau breton (collection "Trilogie des symboles de Bretagne"), Ed. Coop Breizh, 2015 
 Bro Gozh ma Zadoù, l'hymne national breton (collection "Trilogie des symboles de Bretagne"), Ed. Coop Breizh, 2015 
 BZH, l'abréviation bretonne (collection "Trilogie des symboles de Bretagne"), Ed. Coop Breizh, 2015

Maps
European minority peoples, 2004
Hundred Nations of Europe, 2005
Genealogy of the Kings and Dukes of Brittany, 2007
Brittany: Geography of an historical Nation of Europe (60 traditional counties), 2007
9 counties of Brittany, 2008
Peoples of the world, 2009
Frisian countries, 2010
European languages, 2010
Map of the world in breton, 2011
Map of Val-de-Loire, 2012
Map of Kurdistan, 2012
European peoples, ethnographical map of nations and historical regions, 2012

References 

Writers from Brest, France
Breton language activists
1975 births
Living people
Stateless nationalism in Europe
21st-century French male writers
21st-century French non-fiction writers
French male non-fiction writers
French cartographers